Segin (also Romanized as Segīn) is a village in Mardehek Rural District, Jebalbarez-e Jonubi District, Anbarabad County, Kerman Province, Iran. At the 2006 census, it had a population of 412 people within 63 families.

References 

Populated places in Anbarabad County